The County of Heytesbury is one of the 37 counties of Victoria which are part of the cadastral divisions of Australia, used for land titles. The county is in the Western District of Victoria bounded by the Gellibrand River in the east and the Hopkins River in the west. In the north, the county was bounded approximately by the existing road, now the Princes Highway. Larger towns include Camperdown and Cobden. The county was proclaimed in 1849.

Parishes 
Parishes within the county:
Brucknell
Carpendeit
Cooirejong
Coradjil
Ecklin
Elingamite
Jancourt
Laang 
La Trobe (part in the County of Polwarth)
Mepunga
Narrawaturk
Nirranda 
Nullwarre 
Paaratte  
Panmure (part in the County of Hampden)
Pomborneit
Purrumbete South
Tallangatta
Tandarook
Timboon  
Waarre
Wiridjil

References

Research aids, Victoria 1910
Map of the counties of Follett, Dundas, Ripon, Normanby, Villiers, Hampden, Heytesbury / John Sands

Counties of Victoria (Australia)
Barwon South West (region)